Foundation of the Kingdom is a 1983 South Korean historical television series. It aired on KBS1 from January 2, 1983 to December 18, 1983. The series revolves around the fall of Goryeo and the foundation of Joseon.

Cast

Kingdom of Goryeo
Im Hyuk as King Gongmin
Lee Doo-sub as King Woo
Kim Ar-eum as King Chang
Kim Jin-hae as King Gongyang

People around King Gongmin
Sunwoo Eun-sook as Princess Supreme Noguk
Baek Chan-gi as Shin Don
Chaeryung as Lady Ahn, Consort Jung
Jo Nam-kyung as Lady Lee, Consort Hye
Geum Bo-ra as Ban-Ya
Kim Dong-wan as Ahn Do-chi
Jungmin as Bo-Woo
Lee Gye-young as Hong-Ryoon

People around King Woo
Jeon Sung-ae as Lady Lee, Consort Geun
Lee Hyun-jung as young Lady Lee
Kim Soo-yeon as Lady Choi, Consort Yeong
Choi Gyung-sun as Lady Wang, Consort Seon

People around King Gongyang
Park Hye-sook as Lady Noh, Consort Sun

Kingdom of Joseon 
Im Dong-jin as King Taejo
Nam Sung-sik as King Jungjong
Im Hyuk-joo as King Taejong

People around King Taejo
Park Gyung-deuk as Lee Ja-choon, King Hwanjo
Tae Hyun-shil as Lady Han, Queen Shinui
Ha Mi-hye as Lady Kang, Queen Shinduk
Kim Gyung-ha as Grand Prince Wanpung
Tae Min-young as Grand Prince Jinahn
Kim Gi-bok as Grand Prince Ikahn
 -- as Grand Prince Hoiahn
Jeon Ho-jin as Grand Prince Dukahn

Others
Shin Goo as Choi-Young, a Goryeo scholar

Choi Hun-chul as King Wi of Yuan dynasty

Baek Joon-gi as Ajibaldo, a Japanese man

Awards and nominations

References

1983 South Korean television series debuts
1983 South Korean television series endings
1980s South Korean television series
Korean Broadcasting System television dramas
Korean-language television shows
Television series set in the Joseon dynasty
Television series set in Goryeo
South Korean historical television series
Television series set in the 14th century